Susan Elizabeth Andrews (born 26 May 1971 in Hobart, Tasmania) is an Australian retired athlete who mostly competed in the 400 metres. She represented her country at two Summer Olympics, in 1992 and 2000.

She has personal bests of 51.55 seconds in the 400 metres (Melbourne 1998) and 2:00.32 minutes in the 800 metres (Brisbane 2000).

Competition record

References

1972 births
Living people
Australian female sprinters
Athletes (track and field) at the 1990 Commonwealth Games
Athletes (track and field) at the 1998 Commonwealth Games
Athletes (track and field) at the 1992 Summer Olympics
Athletes (track and field) at the 2000 Summer Olympics
Olympic athletes of Australia
Sportspeople from Hobart
Sportswomen from Tasmania
Commonwealth Games medallists in athletics
Commonwealth Games gold medallists for Australia
Commonwealth Games silver medallists for Australia
World Athletics Indoor Championships medalists
Olympic female sprinters
Medallists at the 1990 Commonwealth Games
Medallists at the 1998 Commonwealth Games